Milad Ebadipour Gharahassanlou (born 17 October 1993) is an Iranian professional volleyball player with Polish citizenship. He is a member of the Iran national team, and was a participant in the Olympic Games (Rio 2016, Tokyo 2020). At the professional club level, he plays for Allianz Milano.

Career
Ebadipour was called up to the Iranian national team for the 2014 World League, following his consistent and strong performance in the Iranian Super League, and made his first appearance in the national team in the match against Italy.

Ebadipour made his debut in the Iranian Super League, signing a three–year contract with Kalleh Mazandaran. After the 2017 World League, in August 2017, he joined Polish team Skra Bełchatów. He achieved a bronze medal at the 2017 World Grand Champions Cup, and received an individual award for the Best Outside Spiker of the tournament.

Honours

Clubs
 AVC Asian Club Championship
  Tehran 2013 – with Kalleh Mazandaran
  Naypyidaw 2016 – with Sarmayeh Bank Tehran
  Vietnam 2017 – with Sarmayeh Bank Tehran

 National championships
 2012/2013  Iranian Championship, with Kalleh Mazandaran
 2016/2017  Iranian Championship, with Sarmayeh Bank Tehran
 2016/2017  Emir Cup, with Al Rayyan
 2017/2018  Polish SuperCup, with PGE Skra Bełchatów
 2017/2018  Polish Championship, with PGE Skra Bełchatów
 2018/2019  Polish SuperCup, with PGE Skra Bełchatów

Individual awards
 2016: AVC Asian Club Championship – Best Outside Spiker
 2017: AVC Asian Club Championship – Best Outside Spiker
 2017: FIVB World Grand Champions Cup – Best Outside Spiker
 2021: AVC Asian Championship – Best Outside Spiker

References

External links

 
 
 
 Player profile at LegaVolley.it  
 Player profile at PlusLiga.pl  
 Player profile at Volleybox.net

1993 births
Living people
Naturalized citizens of Poland
People from Urmia
Iranian men's volleyball players
Olympic volleyball players of Iran
Volleyball players at the 2016 Summer Olympics
Volleyball players at the 2020 Summer Olympics
Asian Games medalists in volleyball
Asian Games gold medalists for Iran
Medalists at the 2014 Asian Games
Volleyball players at the 2014 Asian Games
Medalists at the 2018 Asian Games
Volleyball players at the 2018 Asian Games
Iranian expatriate sportspeople in Poland
Expatriate volleyball players in Poland
Iranian expatriate sportspeople in Qatar
Expatriate volleyball players in Qatar
Iranian expatriate sportspeople in Italy
Expatriate volleyball players in Italy
Skra Bełchatów players
Outside hitters
21st-century Iranian people